Daniel Marian Toma (born 22 April 2000) is a Romanian professional footballer who plays as a defensive midfield  for Liga I side CS Mioveni, on loan from FCSB.

Career statistics

Club

References

External links
 
 

2000 births
Living people
Footballers from Bucharest
Romanian footballers
Romania youth international footballers
Romania under-21 international footballers
Association football midfielders
Liga I players
Liga II players
FC Steaua București players
CS Mioveni players
FCV Farul Constanța players